XHECH-FM is a community radio station in Purépero, Michoacán, broadcasting on 105.7 FM. It is owned by Echais 88, A.C.

References

Radio stations in Michoacán
Community radio stations in Mexico
Indigenous radio stations in Mexico
Radio stations established in 2015